André Roussin, (22 January 1911 – 3 November 1987), was a French playwright. Born in Marseille, he was elected to the Académie française on 12 April 1973.

Bibliography
1933  Patiences et impatiences
1944  Am Stram Gram 
1945  Une grande fille toute simple
1945  Jean Baptiste le mal aimé
1945  La Sainte Famille
1947  La petite hutte
1948  Les Œufs de l'autruche
1949  Nina 
1950  Bobosse
1951  La main de César
1951  Lorsque l'enfant paraît
1952  Hélène ou la joie de vivre
1953  Patience et impatiences 
1954  Le Mari, la Femme et la Mort
1955  L'Amour fou ou la première surprise
1957  La Mamma
1960  Les Glorieuses et une femme qui dit la vérité
1962  La Coquine
1963  La Voyante 
1963  Un amour qui ne finit pas
1965  Un contentement raisonnable
1966  La Locomotive
1969  On ne sait jamais
1972  La Claque
1974  La boîte à couleurs
1982  Le rideau rouge, portraits et souvenirs
1982  La vie est trop courte
1983  Rideau gris et habit vert
1987  La petite chatte est morte 
1987  Mesdames, Mesdemoiselles, Messieurs
1987  Treize comédies en un acte

Filmography 
, directed by Jacques Manuel (France, 1948, based on the play Une grande fille toute simple)
, directed by Michel Boisrond (France, 1956, based on the play Lorsque l'enfant paraît) 
The Little Hut, directed by Mark Robson (1957, based on the play La petite hutte) 
 The Ostrich Has Two Eggs, directed by Denys de La Patellière (France, 1957, based on the play Les Œufs de l'autruche) 
Nina, directed by Jean Boyer (France, 1959, based on the play Nina) 
, directed by Étienne Périer (France, 1959, based on the play Bobosse)

External links
  L'Académie française

1911 births
1987 deaths
Writers from Marseille
Members of the Académie Française
20th-century French dramatists and playwrights